Chimed Saikhanbileg (born 17 February 1969) is a Mongolian politician, who served as the 28th Prime Minister of Mongolia from 2014 to 2016, and whose work and career are indispensably associated with political, economic and education reforms, youth organizations, information technology, democracy, investment, and mega-projects of Mongolia. He is accused of corruption, taking bribes from major companies and using his power to benefit his own companies. Saikhanbileg is currently residing somewhere in the United States.

Early life and education
Saikhanbileg was born on 20 January 1969, as the second of 4 children of Chimed Ochir, on the morning of the first day of Tsagaan Sar, the Lunar New Year, one of Mongolia's largest festive holidays, in Bayantumen soum (sub-province) of Dornod aimag, the easternmost province of Mongolia. His father, Chimed Ochir, and mother, Orolmaa Alag, were both engineers. His father oversaw the construction of new industrial, cultural, residential buildings, and the new airport built by the Russian Construction Company in Ulaanbaatar in the capital city of Mongolia and greatly contributed to the development of the city's modern image and look. His mother, Orolmaa, personally carried out the technological work of developing the film of all Mongolian feature films from the early 1960s to the mid-1990s.

Saikhanbileg attended the 45th school in Ulaanbaatar city between 1976 and 1986, for general compulsory education. During his school years, he was a socially active student, serving as a board member of the children's organization of all schools in the capital. In 1983, he organized and supervised the largest Mongolian children's assembly, the 5th Annual Inheritor Conference. He also worked at the Mongolian National Television as a children's show host.

After graduating from secondary school, Saikhanbileg went to Moscow to study history at the Moscow State University for Humanities from 1986 to 1991 and received a bachelor's degree in History and History Education.

When working for the Mongolian Youth Federation, Mongolia's largest youth NGO, Saikhanbileg studied law and received his Bachelor of Law degree from the School of Law of the Mongolian National University in 1995. After his first election and service as a Member of Parliament, Saikhanbileg spent a year in Boulder, Colorado, at the University of Colorado Economics Institute from 2000 to 2001 and subsequently completed his master's degree at The George Washington University Law School in Washington DC, USA.

Political career

As a young student in Moscow, Saikhanbileg witnessed Gorbachev's Perestroika and Glasnost; shortly afterwards, the fall of the Berlin Wall. As soon as he graduated from the University in 1991, he started to actively participate in the Mongolian Democratic Revolution. At that time, the ruling party – the Mongolian People's Revolutionary Party was influencing Mongolian youth through its largest youth organization, Mongolian Revolutionary Youth League. Saikhanbileg initiated and implemented numerous reforms and ideas in line with the ideals and mindsets of youths including the reorganization of this organization into the Mongolian Youth Federation, modernizing its form into that of the classical non-governmental organizations and expelling party influence. In a single year, he advanced within the organization from an ordinary MYF member to the organization's leader.

To determine new principles of democracy and introduce change in the society, Mongolian Youth Federation formed the "Four Union Coalition'' in collaboration with the Democratic Union of Mongolia, the Student Union of Mongolia, and the New Progress Association and organized rallies and demonstrations.

Mongolian Youth Federation and his team gained recognition and popularity not only in Mongolia, but also internationally, and in 1995 the World Youth Assembly named the MYF the "World's Best Youth Organization". In addition to working for the youth organization, he also hosted a very popular TV entertainment and talk shows among the youth such as "Agshin" and VIP.

Saikhanbileg ran and won in the 1996 Mongolian parliamentary election, becoming the youngest Member of the Mongolian Parliament at the age of 27. A number of laws on reforms in the legislative and education sectors he initiated were passed by the Parliament. He was one of the initiating members of the 2000 Constitutional Amendment. Furthermore, he also initiated the Law on Parliament, the Law on the Legal Status of Parliament Members, and the Law on Parliamentary Procedures, which became the basis of today's core legal and regulatory system.

In 1999 he was appointed Minister of Education, Science Technology and Culture by Parliament. His becoming a Cabinet Minister of Mongolia at the age of 29 marks the record of the youngest ministerial appointment in the new Mongolian history. During his tenure, Saikhanbileg reformed the higher (tertiary) education system, passed new tertiary education laws, and began accreditation system of all universities in Mongolia. The legal basis of private schools in the education system were legalized for the first time. In addition, universities came to be governed by an independent board and the appointment of university presidents were freed from political influence. Saikhanbileg also served as the first Chairman of the Board of the National University of Mongolia, the largest and oldest university in Mongolia.

Mongolian youth began attending universities in Russia and Germany in the 1920s forming the first wave of Mongolian intellectuals. The second wave of educating the youth in Russia and Eastern Europe began in the late 1950s and early 1960s and continued through to the 1990s. As Minister of Education, from the late 1990s Saikhanbileg began the third wave of education, training Mongolian youth in USA, Australia, European Union, Japan and Korea which has continued to today, preparing the next generation of Mongolian professionals. This effort was complemented by Government's support to students – stipends, tuition loans and aid. Additionally, he had the Law on Science and Technology approved, securing 1.5% of the annual government budget for science and technology.

Saikhanbileg studied for 2 years in the United States of America after the 2000 Parliamentary Election. While studying at GWU, he conceived 2 ideas to implement in Mongolia and successfully achieved them after graduation. The first was estate planning, which was a concept unfamiliar to the Mongolian people. He established E&T Law Firm and worked there from 2002 to 2004. The second idea was to establish a secondary school in line with American standards in Mongolia. Finding a partner and raising over US$10 million, he founded the American School of Ulaanbaatar (ASU) making it one of the most prestigious schools today. Each year, more than 600 students enroll in the K-12 program and each graduate is accepted into prestigious foreign schools. ASU has become one of the private benchmark schools, and many other schools have worked hard to reach its standards. This project was an important contribution to the American-Mongolian relationship as well as introducing American teaching and pedagogical standards and curricula in Mongolia.

Saikhanbileg was appointed the Chairman of Information and Communication Technology Authority of the Mongolian Government after the 2004 Parliamentary Election where he served until 2008. Under his leadership, 2004 to 2008 was a period of rapid development in telecommunications and information technologies in Mongolia.

He personally oversaw and completed the construction of high-speed Internet access and fiber-optic cables in 1.5 million km2 area of Mongolia, connecting 21 aimags and 330 soums during those years. This fiber-optic network became the first infrastructure in Mongolia to connect the entire country. Within only 4 years, a new network spanning almost 10,000 km had been built. He successfully managed the re-negotiation of a 20-year contract with the Korea Telecom company, which had been signed in 1995 and had granted the company an exclusive right to use central telecommunication network. Saikhanbileg was able to remove the exclusive rights, inviting fair competition to the industry. With the advent of two new cellular carriers, competition flourished, leading to reduction of users' bills by almost 3 to 4 times. Cellular phone user numbers increased to 4.3 million for 3 million Mongolians, making Mongolia a country with a leading mobile penetration rate. The percentage of smartphone users has grown to over 80%. At his initiative, the projects "E-Mongolia", "E-Government", "Internet for Every Family" and "A Computer for Every Child" were successfully implemented and the total size of Internet traffic was increased by a factor of 400. The IPTV project to connect Mongolia to the main fiber-optic network that connects Asia and Europe, was successfully implemented allowing the user to rewind any program aired within 72 hours. E-government project eliminated bureaucracy and red-tape in government services and enabled numerous innovative services to reach the public.

His phenomenal transformations of Mongolia's IT industry won him the highest number of votes in 2008 Parliamentary Election in the Ulaanbaatar city constituency thus making him a second-term Member of Parliament.

2008 and 2009 were trying years for Mongolia due to the global financial crisis. The political situation was also tense after the mass riot on July 1, 2008. During this time, the two largest political parties put aside their differences, establishing a coalition and launched the largest economic project, the Oyu Tolgoi (OT). In those challenging circumstances Saikhanbileg led the Democratic Party floor in the Parliament, one of the two largest factions, and boldly solved pressing political and economic issues in 2008–2012.

His leadership, management skills, problem-solving techniques and enabling attitude were constructive in overcoming the financial crisis, implementing the IMF program, subsequently attaining 14.5% economic growth and starting and advancing the complex Oyu Tolgoi project.

In 2012 Parliamentary election, Saikhanbileg became a Member of Parliament for the third time, his Democratic Party faction gained the most number of seats in the Parliament and formed the Government. Saikhanbileg was appointed Chief of the Cabinet Secretariat, a Cabinet Minister.

As Chief of the Cabinet Secretariat, Saikhanbileg undertook a series of important reforms to alleviate the burden of red-tape on business, invite for more openness along the core of World Bank Doing Business indicators, and within only 2 years, Mongolia advanced to the 56th from 97th in the world ranking. Moreover, by certain indicators, Mongolia excelled to rank among the top 20 countries.

He established a permanent 11-11 Call Center for citizens to submit complaints and feedback, introduced government service electronic machines capable of providing 34 public services, implemented reforms in the professional inspectorate, and reformed government-issued permits for businesses and citizens, lowering the number from 900 to 300.

Saikhanbileg was appointed the 28th Prime Minister of Mongolia on 21 November 2014. It was a time of crisis, with plunging commodity prices (commodities as gold, copper, and coal being the main revenue earners for Mongolia) and shrinking Foreign Direct Investment (FDI). In his address to the Parliament on the day of his appointment as the country's Premier, Saikhanbileg noted: "My Government's priority will be the Economy, with the second priority being the Economy and the third – Economy".

He was able to realistically plan for a modest budget revenue and reduced the budget expenditures by MNT 2 trillion consecutively for 2 years. Collaborating with the Bank of Mongolia, he implemented "Good" programs with the intent to protect low-income segments of the population and support the middle class. Also, as a result of implementing the VAT registration system reform, cash transactions were drastically reduced and the number of cash and cashless transaction machines were increased by a factor of 4 in just the first year. Compared with economic performance of 2008–2009, when the country was under the same grave economic conditions and had shrunk by 1.3%, the economy under Saikhanbileg's management grew modestly by 1.3%, under the prevalently same tough economic circumstances.

FDI has been one of the key drivers of Mongolia's economic growth.

Saikhanbileg, as Prime Minister, worked relentlessly to attract foreign investment to Mongolia. He visited the main capital markets: London, New York, Dubai, Hong Kong, Tokyo, and Singapore, met with the leaders, businesses, and investors from those countries, organized Investment conferences in each country he visited, presented Mongolian markets and mega projects and invited them to invest. He also visited prominent television studios such as CNBC, CNN, Bloomberg, BBC, and CCTV for live programs to speak about the political environment surrounding the Mongolian economy and investment. He met with the World Bank, IMF, IFC, Credit Suisse, EBRD, ADB and ING, and their executives, and came up with specific solutions for investment and co-operation in Mongolia.

As a result, the two-year negotiation of Oyu Tolgoi Underground Mine was concluded and the decision to launch a $4.2 billion construction project was reached on 19 May 2015. More than half of the 6 to 7 percent Mongolian economic growth of today can be directly attributed to this project, launched by the financing of 14 international banks. Currently, 14,000 Mongolians and over 1,000 Mongolian companies are taking part in the project.

Inaugurating the Oyu Tolgoi Project, Saikhanbileg said: "From now on, the OT project transforms from a controversial political matter into a business project. From now on, the matter will be settled by the members of the board and not by politicians." But to this day, some authorities and parliament members continue to politicize the subject of OT and employ it as a topic for populism.

During his service as a Prime Minister, Saikhanbileg attended and spoke at diverse international forums and fora such as WEF in Davos, Summer Davos forums and the St. Petersburg Economic Forum, speaking for Mongolia's challenges, solutions and successes.

Prime Minister Saikhanbileg made timely decisions to seize the opportunity to purchase a 49% stake in Erdenet Copper Mine [which bears no less than OT at an economic value for Mongolia], held by Russia. These critical decisions transferred the title of a MNT 4.9 trillion worth asset to Mongolia.

Just these two actions - securing the OT underground mine's US$4.2 billion investment and the Erdenet Copper Plant valued at MNT 4.9 trillion title transfer to Mongolia are the legacy of his Prime Ministership.

In July 2016, as a Prime Minister of Mongolia, Saikhanbileg hosted the leaders of state and government of 53 countries of Europe and Asia for the ASEM Summit  in the capital city of Mongolia, Ulaanbaatar. He personally chaired the Organizing Committee of ASEM and took the charge for the successful and effective organization of important meetings within ASEM.

Family and personal life
Saikhanbileg is married and is a father of three. He met his wife, Baigal, at the Mongolian Student Festival on the shores of Baikal (Baigal) lake. Saikhanbileg and Baigal married in 1993. His spouse, Baigal graduated from the Mongolian National University of Arts and Culture with a degree in acting. She starred in 6 Mongolian feature films and dramas, immortalizing her youth on the screen. In her youth, she was named Mongolia's Top Model. After her husband entered the political arena, she ended her acting career and fully devoted herself to the family as a loving wife and a caring mother. As their children grew, Baigal started her own business. She founded one of the first beauty salons in Mongolia, Baigal Beauty (lit. Natural Beauty) in 2002. Furthermore, she expanded her Baigal House company to souvenirs and accessories featuring ancient Mongolian arts and traditions. She was selected as one of the 50 Top Business Women in Mongolia by Forbes Magazine in 2019.

The eldest son, Unubileg Saikhanbileg graduated from Embry-Riddle Aeronautical University in Florida, USA and started as a pilot in Aero Mongolia aircompany. Currently, he is a pilot of a Boeing 767 at MIAT Mongolian Airlines, the national flag-carrier company. The eldest daughter Unuhishig Saikhanbileg is a senior at Babson College in Boston, USA. The youngest daughter Unu-Erdene Saikhanbileg is a primary school student.

In recognition for his devoted service to his country, Saikhanbileg was awarded with state decorations – Order of the Red Banner of Labour and the Order of the Golden Polar Star.

Saikhanbileg is fluent in Mongolian, Russian and English. He believes that every young Mongolian should learn the main international language-English and the languages of the two main neighboring countries, People's Republic of China and Russian Federation. To set an example for the youths of today, he is currently learning Mandarin Chinese.

In his leisure, Saikhanbileg enjoys Powerlifting. His personal records are 185 kg bench press, 220 kg squat and 160 kg deadlift. He was elected the President of the Mongolian Powerlifting Federation from 2010 to 2017. He loves mountaineering. He successfully climbed 3 mountain peaks above 4,000 meters in Mongolia.

References

1969 births
Democratic Party (Mongolia) politicians
Government ministers of Mongolia
Living people
Members of the State Great Khural
National University of Mongolia alumni
People from Dornod Province
Prime Ministers of Mongolia
Heads of government who were later imprisoned